The International Blind Sports Federation is a non-profit organisation founded 1981 in Paris, France.  It was formerly known as the International Blind Sports Association. IBSA's mission is to promote the full integration of blind and partially-sighted people in society through sport and to encourage people with a visual impairment to take up and practise sports. IBSA is a full and founding member of the International Paralympic Committee (IPC). 

In March 2022, in light of the 2022 Russian invasion of Ukraine, it banned Russian and Belarusian athletes and officials from its events.



History 

The International Blind Sports Association, known by the acronym 'IBSA', was formed in 1981.

The inaugural IBSA president was Paralympic runner and skier Jens Bromann (from Denmark) who served eight years, before becoming involved with the International Paralympic Committee from 1988 to 1992.  IBSA was one of four organisations, later six, which formed the 'International Co-coordinating Committee Sports for the Disabled in the World' (ICC) in 1982, which on 22 September 1989 became the International Paralympic Committee, as the global governing body of the Paralympic movement.

Second president (1993 to 2001) was Enrique Sanz (from Spain), followed by Enrique Perrez (2001 to 2005; also from Spain).  Fourth president Michael Barredo (from Philippines) served two terms, from 2005 to 2013. Jannie Hammershøi (from Denmark), a former Paralympic goalball athlete, commenced in September 2013 to serve three terms.

The association changed its name to federation between 2002 and 2003, when based in Spain and used the web address www.ibsa.es.  The federation was later relocated and registered to Bonn, Germany.  Its logo also changed at sometime from a representation of a globe, to its initials with the federation name below; in both logos, the acronym of IBSA being represented in Braille dots.

Sixth president Sandro Di Girolamo (from Italy), the president of the Italian blind sports association, commenced a four-year term from Monday 11 October 2021.

Sports 

IBSA is the international federation for several sports for people with a visual impairment, including three Paralympic sports (blind football, goalball and judo), powerlifting, ten-pin bowling, nine-pin bowling, torball, and showdown.  

Competition is held within five regions: Africa, America, Asia, Europe, and Oceania.  For the sport of goalball, competitively Asia and Oceania are drawn together as 'Asia-Pacific' region.

Sporting events 

IBSA's showcase event is the IBSA World Championships and Games, held every four years. The first games took place in 1998 in Madrid, Spain, followed by the event in 2003 at Quebec City, Quebec, Canada. The 3rd edition of the games was held in Sao Paulo, Brazil, in 2007, and the 2011 games took place in Antalya, Turkey.

In 2015, between 8 May and 18 May, the 5th IBSA World Championships and Games was held in Seoul, South Korea, and included competitions in powerlifting, judo, goalball, football, chess, tenpin bowling, tandem cycling, swimming, showdown, and athletics.

IBSA also organizes world and regional championships in many of its sports. Regional or continental championships are generally held in odd years, while world championships take place every four years in even years when there are no Paralympic Games.

Events

IBSA World Games

IBSA World Youth Games (WYC) 

 Former name: IBSA World Youth and Student Games

See also
 Blind football in Australia
 International Paralympic Committee
 Paralympic Games
 Ski for Light

References

External links
IBSA official website

 
Parasports organizations
Sports organizations established in 1981
Goalball
International sports organizations